The Big Easy is an American crime drama series that was based on the 1987 film of the same name.

The show premiered on the USA Network on August 11, 1996. Tony Crane played New Orleans police detective lieutenant Remy McSwain, Susan Walters played state district attorney Anne Osbourne, and Barry Corbin played police chief C.D. LeBlanc. It was developed by Jacqueline Zambrano, based on the characters created by Daniel Petrie Jr., who wrote the screenplay to the film and also was the executive producer of the series. Thirty-five episodes were broadcast over two seasons.

The series takes place in New Orleans, Louisiana, and was shot on location.

Premise
A male New Orleans detective and a female district attorney investigate crimes for the New Orleans police department.

Episodes

Cast
Tony Crane as Det. Remy McSwain
Barry Corbin as Sheriff C.D. LeBlanc
Eric George as Smiley Dupree
Susan Walters as Anne Osbourne (season 1)
Karla Tamburelli as Det. Darlene Broussard (season 1)
Troy Bryant as A.D.A. Lightin' Hawkins (season 1)
Leslie Bibb as Det. Janine Rebbenack (season 2)

References

External links
 
 The Big Easy Tony Crane/The Big Easy fan site
 Big Easy Fan fan site

1990s American crime drama television series
1996 American television series debuts
1997 American television series endings
English-language television shows
Fictional portrayals of the New Orleans Police Department
Television shows set in New Orleans
Live action television shows based on films
Television series by Universal Television
USA Network original programming
Television series about prosecutors